Houston High School is a public high school in Houston, Ohio.  It is the only high school in the Hardin-Houston Local School district.  The Wildcats wear red and white.

In 2008, Houston High School won their 3rd straight Division 4 District Championship in basketball.
In 2010, they won their eighth straight softball championship in the Shelby County Athletic League.

References

External links
 Hardin-Houston School Website

High schools in Shelby County, Ohio
Public high schools in Ohio